USS Housatonic was a screw sloop-of-war of the United States Navy, gaining its namesake from the Housatonic River of New England.

Housatonic was launched on 20 November 1861, by the Boston Navy Yard at Charlestown, Massachusetts, sponsored by Miss Jane Coffin Colby and Miss Susan Paters Hudson; and commissioned there on 29 August 1862, with Commander William Rogers Taylor in command.

Service history

Blockading Charleston
Housatonic departed Boston on 11 September and arrived at Charleston, South Carolina, on 19 September to join the South Atlantic Blockading Squadron. She took station outside the bar.

Capture of Princess Royal and Confederate counter-attack
The gunboat  had driven the blockade runner ashore as she attempted to slip into Charleston from England with a cargo consisting of two marine engines destined for Confederate ironclads and a large quantity of ordnance and ammunition. These imports were of such great potential value to the South that they have been called "the war's most important single cargo of contraband."

It is possibly in the hope of recovering this invaluable prize that the Confederate ironclad rams  and  slipped out of the main ship channel of Charleston Harbor to attack the Union blockading fleet in the early morning fog two days later. They rammed , forcing her to strike her colors "in a sinking and perfectly defenseless condition", and moved on to cripple . Gunfire from the rams also damaged  and  before the Confederate ships withdrew under fire from Housatonic to the protection of shore batteries.

Capture of Georgiana
Georgianas cargo of munitions, medicine and merchandise was then valued at over $1,000,000. This was a serious and very important blow to the Confederacy. The wreck of Georgiana was discovered by pioneer underwater archaeologist Lee Spence in 1965.

Further captures, and attacks on Charleston
Housatonic captured the sloop Neptune on 19 April as she attempted to run out of Charleston with a cargo of cotton and turpentine. She was credited with assisting in the capture of the steamer Seesh on 15 May. Howitzers mounted in Housatonics boats joined in the attack on Fort Wagner on 10 July, which began the continuing bombardment of the Southern works at Charleston. In ensuing months her crew repeatedly deployed boats which shelled the shoreline, patrolled close ashore gathering valuable information, and landed troops for raids against the outer defenses of Charleston.

Sunk in the first submarine attack

At just before 9pm, 17 February 1864, Housatonic, commanded by Charles Pickering, was maintaining her station in the blockade outside the bar. Robert F. Flemming, Jr., a black landsman, first sighted an object in the water 100 yards off, approaching the ship. "It had the appearance of a plank moving in the water," Pickering later reported. Although the chain was slipped, the engine backed, and all hands were called to quarters, it was too late. Within two minutes of the first sighting, the Confederate submarine  rammed her spar torpedo into Housatonics starboard side, forward of the mizzenmast, in history's first successful submarine attack on a warship. Before the rapidly sinking ship went down, the crew managed to lower two boats which took all the men they could hold; most others saved themselves by climbing into the rigging which remained above water after the stricken ship settled on the bottom. Two officers and three men in Housatonic died. The Confederate submarine escaped but was lost with all hands not long after this action; new evidence announced by archaeologists in 2013 indicates that the submarine may have been much closer to the point of detonation than previously realized, thus damaging the submarine as well. In 2017, researchers at Duke University further established through simulation that the Hunley's crew were most likely killed immediately at their posts by the blast's pressure wave damaging their lungs and brains.

The wreck of Housatonic was largely scrapped in the 1870s–1890s and her location was eventually removed from coastal navigation charts and lost to history. The anchor of Housatonic can be found at the office of Wild Dunes on the Isle of Palms.

See also

 List of sailing frigates of the United States Navy
 Bibliography of early United States naval history

References

 

Sloops of the United States Navy
Ships of the Union Navy
Ships built in Boston
Shipwrecks of the Carolina coast
Shipwrecks of the American Civil War
Disasters in South Carolina
Maritime incidents in February 1864
Ships sunk by submarines
Archaeological sites in South Carolina
Charleston County, South Carolina
1861 ships